Jakob Forssmed (born 28 December 1974) is a Swedish politician for the Christian Democratic party. Since 18 October 2022, he is the Minister for Social Affairs in the Ulf Kristersson cabinet. He has been a Member of Parliament since 2014, elected for the Stockholm County constituency, and First Deputy Party Chairman under party leader Ebba Busch since 2015.

References

1974 births
Living people
Government ministers of Sweden
Members of the Riksdag from the Christian Democrats (Sweden)